Maurice de Prendergast was a Norman knight, fl. 1169–1174.

Maurice was from Prendergast, now in Haverfordwest, Wales, and was hired in 1169 by the ruler of the Irish kingdom of Osraige, Domnall Mac Gilla Pátraic, to resist the Leinster king, Diarmait Mac Murchada, who had also recruited Norman aid. He afterwards participated in the Norman invasion of Ireland. He was one of the first members of the expedition to land in Bannow Bay in May 1169, along with Meiler FitzHenry and Miles FitzDavid. He took part in the Siege of Wexford.

F.X. Martin in the "Expugnatio" states that "the first edition of the Expugnatio has no reference to the arrival of Maurice de Prendergast but the later edition include the information that Maurice de Prendergast came the following day, was a valiant soldier from Rhos in South Wales, embarked at Milford with ten men-at-arms and a large body of archers in two ships, and that he also landed at Bannow."

References
Expugnatio Hibernica:The Conquest of Ireland, p. 293, 294, 295, 296-97, 298, 299, 301, 302, 307, 308, 321, by Giraldus Cambrensis, ed. A.B. Scott and F. X. Martin, 1978. .

Anglo-Normans in Wales
People from Pembrokeshire
12th-century Welsh people
Norman warriors
Norman participants of the invasion of Ireland